Omagbemi is a surname. Notable people with the surname include:

 Dudu Omagbemi (born 1985), Nigerian footballer
 James Omagbemi (1930–2012), Nigerian sprinter
 Victor Omagbemi (born 1967), Nigerian sprinter
 Mary Onyali-Omagbemi (born 1968), Nigerian sprinter, wife of Victor

Surnames of Nigerian origin